"(There's) Always Something There to Remind Me" is a song by songwriting team Burt Bacharach and Hal David. Originally recorded as a demo by Dionne Warwick in 1963, "(There's) Always Something There to Remind Me" first charted for Lou Johnson, whose version reached No. 49 on the Billboard Hot 100 in the summer of 1964.  Sandie Shaw took the song to No. 1 in the UK that same year, while the duo Naked Eyes had a No. 8 hit with the song in the US two decades later in 1983.

Sandie Shaw version 

British impresario Eve Taylor heard Johnson's version while on a US visit scouting for material for her recent discovery Sandie Shaw, who consequently covered the song for the UK market. Rush-released in September 1964, the song was premiered by Shaw with a performance on Ready Steady Go!, the pop music TV program. The first week after its release, the single sold 65,000 copies. Shaw's version reached No. 1 on the UK Singles Chart, spending three weeks at the top of that listing in November 1964, and that same month it debuted on the Billboard Hot 100. However, despite reaching the Top Ten in some markets including Detroit and Miami Shaw's version failed to best the US showing of the Lou Johnson original; the Hot 100 peak of Shaw's version was No. 52.

A No. 1 hit in Canada and South Africa, Shaw's version of "...Always Something There to Remind Me" was also a hit in Australia (No. 16), Ireland (No. 7) and the Netherlands (No. 10), the track's success in the last territory not precluding hit status for the Dutch rendering by  entitled  "Ik moet altijd weer opnieuw aan je denken" (No. 12). A cover by Eddy Mitchell was more successful, reaching No. 2 in France in April 1965 and also reaching No. 3 on Belgium's French-language chart. Shaw made a bid for a German hit as well, rendering "...Always Something There to Remind Me" as "Einmal glücklich sein wie die ander'n". It was not a success.

Chart history

R. B. Greaves version 

"(There's) Always Something There to Remind Me" – as "Always Something There to Remind Me" – entered the US Top 40 for the first time via a version by R. B. Greaves which reached No. 27 in February 1970. Recorded at Muscle Shoals Sound Studio in 1969, with production by Ahmet Ertegun and Jackson Howe, Greaves' version was also a No. 3 Easy Listening hit. This version peaked at number 48 in Australia. In Canada, it reached number 12.

Naked Eyes version 

Nearly 20 years after its composition, the song became a major hit in the US for the first time via a synth-pop reinvention by Naked Eyes titled "Always Something There to Remind Me", which reached the top 10 of the Billboard Hot 100 in the summer of 1983.

Vocalist Pete Byrne and keyboardist Rob Fisher first cut "Always Something There to Remind Me" as one of a number of demos recorded in Bristol upon forming the duo later known as Naked Eyes in early 1982. Byrne would recall: "I had always loved the song "Always Something There to Remind Me" so we called a friend who had the record, he read the lyric over the phone and we put it together from memory."

On the strength of the demos cut in Bristol, Byrne and Fisher were signed to EMI Records in May 1982 and the track "Always Something There to Remind Me" was cut on 1 September 1982 in a session at Abbey Road Studios produced by Tony Mansfield. Byrne would recall: "The record was recorded at Abbey Road, and we were invited to a party downstairs, with Paul McCartney and many other stars...When we returned upstairs to the studio around 1 a.m., I decided to have a go at the vocal, it was the first time I have ever recorded a vocal in one take".

Originally released in the UK in 1982, Naked Eyes' "Always Something There to Remind Me" gradually gained attention, entering the Billboard Hot 100 in March 1983 to peak at No. 8 that June. The cachet of entering the US top 10 allowed the single, previously overlooked in its performers' United Kingdom homeland, to make a July 1983 UK chart debut, although it only rose to No. 59. "Always Something There to Remind Me" did afford Naked Eyes top 10 success in other countries besides the United States: Australia (No. 7), Canada (No. 9) and New Zealand (No. 2).

Charts

Tin Tin Out featuring Espiritu version 

English electronic music duo Tin Tin Out recorded a house cover of the song titled "Always (Something There to Remind Me)" in 1995. The song features vocals by French singer Espiritu (aka Vanessa Quinones) and went to No. 14 on the UK Singles Chart and No. 1 on the UK Dance Singles Chart. A music video was made to accompany the single, filmed in the Café de Paris in London.

Critical reception 
A reviewer from Pan-European magazine Music & Media wrote, "The first thing she reminds you of is all the previous versions of this Burt Bacharach & Hal David song. Spirited and dancey as it is, it doesn't make a poor figure at all." Brad Beatnik from Music Week'''s RM Dance Update commented, "This unabashed house cover of Dusty Springfield's 'Always Something There To Remind Me' is already on its way into the dancefloor history books thanks to its initial Hooj Choons release and its ability to whip a club into a total frenzy. Simple in its piano house format and chugging Euro rhythm, this is hardbag house at its purest and most joyful." Another editor, James Hamilton noted, "Vannessa calmly croons the title over piping wheezy organ and plonking piano in [a] naggingly effective simple jiggly chugging 0-129.7bpm [track]".

 Track listings 

 Charts 

References

Further reading
Serene Dominic. Burt Bacharach, song by song: the ultimate Burt Bacharach reference for fans''. Schirmer Trade (New York NY) 2003. 
 Karina, Spanish pop singer, recorded a cover for Hispavox Records in 1966

1964 singles
1970 singles
1995 singles
Songs with lyrics by Hal David
Songs with music by Burt Bacharach
Dionne Warwick songs
Sandie Shaw songs
1982 debut singles
Naked Eyes songs
R. B. Greaves songs
José Feliciano songs
The Four Seasons (band) songs
Jay and the Americans songs
Brenda Lee songs
Peggy Lee songs
Martha and the Vandellas songs
Johnny Mathis songs
Labelle songs
Blue Swede songs
Viola Wills songs
The Troggs songs
The Carpenters songs
Tin Tin Out songs
Madness (band) songs
RPM Top Singles number-one singles
Number-one singles in South Africa
UK Singles Chart number-one singles
Pye Records singles
Reprise Records singles
Atco Records singles
EMI Records singles
EMI America Records singles
Warner Music Group singles
Song recordings produced by Tony Mansfield
Song recordings produced by Tony Hatch
1964 songs
Torch songs